The 2019 Supertaça Cândido de Oliveira was the 41st edition of the Supertaça Cândido de Oliveira. It was played between the champions of the 2018–19 Primeira Liga, Benfica, and the winners of the 2018–19 Taça de Portugal, crosstown rivals Sporting CP, on 4 August 2019.
Benfica won the match 5–0 and thus secured their eighth title overall.

Venue
Estádio Algarve was announced as the venue for the 2019 edition of the Supertaça Cândido de Oliveira on 28 May 2019, following the decision of the Portuguese Football Federation Directive Board, four years after hosting the same clubs in a final that ended in a 1–0 win to Sporting CP. After three consecutive years at the Estádio Municipal de Aveiro, the competition returns to the stadium owned by the municipalities of Faro and Loulé.

Background

Pre-match

Entry

Officials

Ticketing

Match

Details

References

Supertaça Cândido de Oliveira
S.L. Benfica matches
Sporting CP matches
2019–20 in Portuguese football
August 2019 sports events in Portugal